Victa is an Australian manufacturer of outdoor garden equipment, including petrol and electric lawn mowers, edgers, trimmers, and chainsaws. They manufacture these in petrol & lithium-ion powered variants. However, Victa remains most well known for the Victa Lawn Mower.

The Victa brand is currently owned by the American engine manufacturer Briggs & Stratton; while being American owned, some assembly is retained in Australia with much occurring at various sites overseas. Manufacturing also primarily occurs overseas.

In Australia & New Zealand, Victa Products are sold through Bunnings Warehouse, specialist dealers and Mitre 10. Victa is also sold in limited quantities through specialist dealers internationally.

History 

The company was founded by Mervyn Victor Richardson in 1952.
In 1970 Victa was acquired by Sunbeam Corporation Ltd. In 1996, the company was sold to GUD Holdings Limited, who sold the Victa Lawn Care business to American-based Briggs & Stratton for A$23 million in 2008.

In the 1960s, Victa produced a range of project homes in Australia.

While most design and manufacturing capability has remained in Australia, such as assembly, research and development, and parts for manufacture, all engine products are sourced from Briggs & Stratton's Facilities in Milwaukee, Wisconsin.

See also
 City of Canada Bay Museum

References 

Further reading
 "Aussie Icon Falls into American Hands" , Brisbane Times, 2008-06-04

External links

 
 Australian Innovates
 Victa Lawn Mower patent at IP Australia website  
 National Museum of Australia 1958 Victa lawn mower, one of two held at the National Museum of Australia.

Manufacturing companies of Australia
Australian brands
Lawn mower manufacturers
Australian inventions